Yarmouth is a town, port and civil parish in the west of the Isle of Wight, off the south coast of England. The town is named for its location at the mouth of the small Western Yar river. The town grew near the river crossing, originally a ferry, which was replaced with a road bridge in 1863.

History

Yarmouth has been a settlement for over a thousand years, and is one of the earliest on the island. The first account of the settlement is in Æthelred the Unready's record of the Danegeld tax of 991, when it was called Eremue, meaning "muddy estuary". The Normans laid out the streets on a grid system, a plan which can still be seen today. It grew rapidly, being given its first charter as a town in 1135. The town became a parliamentary borough in the Middle Ages, and the Yarmouth constituency was represented by two members of Parliament until 1832.

Until the castle was built, raids by the French hurt the town; in 1544 the it was reputed to have been burned down. Legend has it that the church bells were carried off to Cherbourg or Boulogne.

Yarmouth Castle was built in 1547, and is now in the care of English Heritage. It is effectively a gun platform, built by Henry VIII to fortify the Solent and protect against any attempted invasion of England.

For many years Yarmouth was the seat of the Governor of the Island. Yarmouth Town Hall was built in 1763.

In St. James's Church, there is a monument to the 17th century admiral Sir Robert Holmes who was at Yarmouth. He obtained it in a raid on a French ship, when he seized an unfinished statue of Louis XIV of France and forced the sculptor to finish it with his own head rather than the king's.

In 1784, most of Yarmouth's ancient charters were lost:  A ship's captain, drunk after a court dinner, stole what he thought was a case of wine, as he returned to his ship.  When he discovered it was a case of books, he threw it overboard.

Yarmouth Pier was opened in 1876. It received Grade 2 listed status in 1975. Originally 685 ft (207.5m) long, it's now 609 ft (186m) but is still the longest timber pier in England open to the public, and also a docking point for the MV Balmoral and PS Waverley.

Several Sites of Special Scientific Interest lie close to Yarmouth, including Yar Estuary SSSI & Bouldnor And Hamstead Cliffs SSSI.

Commerce

As a port and market town Yarmouth has had local commercial significance. It still has some boat yards and chandlery, and although relatively small it still supports a number of shops, hotels, pubs and restaurants, supported partly by passing trade from the ferry terminal and visiting boat owners.

Transport
The Wightlink car ferry sails from Yarmouth to Lymington in Hampshire.

Southern Vectis operate bus services from Yarmouth bus station, a small building near the ferry terminal, the main route being route 7 serving Totland, Alum Bay, Freshwater, Newport and Shalfleet as well as Yarmouth. To reach Yarmouth, route 7 uses Pixley Hill, which has caused some controversy amongst local residents who do not believe the road is large enough for buses. The controversy was initially started by former route 11 being extended to serve Yarmouth and using the lane in September 2008.

In the spring and summer, Southern Vectis also operate an open top bus called "The Needles Breezer" that runs through Freshwater Bay to Alum Bay and onto the Needles Battery down a bus and pedestrian-only road along the cliff edge; returning to Yarmouth via Totland and Colwell. For the more athletic, Yarmouth is on the Isle of Wight Coastal Path.

The parish was once served by Yarmouth railway station, with services to Newport. Passenger services ended in 1953, and the track has long since been removed; the trackbed between Yarmouth and Freshwater has been converted into a bridleway. In August 2014 the converted and expanded railway station opened as a restaurant.

Size and population
Yarmouth is one of the smallest towns in the United Kingdom. The 2011 census reported the parish of Yarmouth having 865 usual residents. In 2001, the population was just 791 (compared with about 600 at the beginning of the 19th century).

Today
Yarmouth hosted the popular biannual Old Gaffers festival which included several days of entertainment and shows, but in September 2018 it was announced that the event would no longer be held.

Yarmouth marina is the landing point for the Royal Navy's Solent Amphibious Challenge, held in June each year.

References

External links 

 Yarmouth Town Council website
 Yarmouth Harbour website

 
Towns on the Isle of Wight
Ports and harbours of the Isle of Wight
Civil parishes in the Isle of Wight